TNB may stand for:
 Trinitrobenzene, kinds of nitrated benzene-derivatives
 Tacoma Narrows Bridge, Washington state, US
 Throgs Neck Bridge, New York City, US
 TNB frame (Tangent-Normal-Binormal), a mathematical coordinate system
 Tenaga Nasional Berhad, an electricity company in Malaysia
 National Theatre Bucharest (Teatrul Naţional "Ion Luca Caragiale" București)
 The National Bank (Palestine)
 Transthoracic needle biopsy, a type of lung biopsy
 Tuas Naval Base, the second naval base of the Republic of Singapore Navy